The Seven Moons of Maali Almeida is a 2022 novel by Sri Lankan author Shehan Karunatilaka. It won the 2022 Booker Prize, the announcement being made at a ceremony at the Roundhouse in London on 17 October 2022. The Seven Moons of Maali Almeida was published on 4 August 2022 by the small independent London publisher Sort of Books. An earlier, unrevised version of the novel was originally published in the Indian subcontinent as Chats with the Dead in 2020.

Summary
The novel is set in Sri Lanka in the 1980s, and written in the second person. The central character, Maali Almeida, is a dead photographer who sets out to solve the mystery of his own death and is given one week ("seven moons") during which he can travel between the afterlife and the real world. In this time, he hopes to retrieve a set of photographs, stored under a bed, and to persuade his friends to share them widely to expose the brutalities of the Sri Lankan Civil War.

Background and publication
Karunatilaka wrote his second novel in various versions with different titles. When the first draft was shortlisted for the Gratiaen Prize in 2015, it was titled Devil Dance. It was originally published in the Indian subcontinent as Chats with the Dead in 2020 by Penguin India's Hamish Hamilton imprint. Karunatilaka struggled to find an international publisher for the novel because most deemed Sri Lankan politics "esoteric and confusing" and many felt "the mythology and worldbuilding was impenetrable, and difficult for Western readers." The independent British publishing house Sort of Books agreed to publish the novel after editing to "make it familiar to Western readers." Karunatilaka revised the work for two years due to its publication being delayed by the COVID-19 pandemic. He has commented: "I'd say it's the same book, but it benefits from two years of tightening and is much more accessible. It is a bit confusing to have the same book with two different titles, but I think the eventual play is that The Seven Moons of Maali Almeida will become the definitive title and text."

Reception
The Seven Moons of Maali Almeida won the 2022 Booker Prize, announced at a ceremony at The Roundhouse in London on 17 October 2022, the award being presented to the author by Camilla, Queen Consort. The judges – the panel comprising Neil MacGregor (chair), Shahidha Bari, Helen Castor, M. John Harrison and Alain Mabanckou – said that the novel "fizzes with energy, imagery and ideas against a broad, surreal vision of the Sri Lankan civil wars. Slyly, angrily comic."

Review coverage 
The Seven Moons of Maali Almeida was characterised by Charlie Connelly in The New European as "part ghost story, part whodunnit, part political satire ... a wonderful book about Sri Lanka, friendship, grief and the afterlife". The verdict of The Sydney Morning Herald was: "Original, sensational, imaginative, political, mysterious, romantic: it is obvious why this novel won the prize. ...It has the bleak power of Solzhenitsyn's The Gulag Archipelago. And unlike that great book it is relentlessly, shockingly funny."

The review by Randy Boyagoda in The New York Times said that the novel "offers a very palatable combination of literary-political-ethical challenges, enjoyments and validations to its readers, including a sense of timeliness." Literary Review observed: "Witty, inventive and moving, Karunatilaka’s prose is gloriously free of cliché, and despite the apparent cynicism of his smart-alec narrator, this is a deeply moral book that eschews the simple moralising of so much contemporary fiction."

Describing the novel as "brilliant", the TLS review continued: "It is messy and chaotic in all the best ways. It is also a pleasure to read: Karunatilaka writes with tinder-dry wit and an unfaltering ear for prose cadences." The Financial Times reviewer concluded: "The Seven Moons of Maali Almeida is an ambitious novel, epic in scope (mixing tropes from thrillers, crime fiction and magic realism) and a powerful evocation of Sri Lanka's brutal past."

References

2022 novels
Booker Prize-winning works
Novels about the afterlife
Novels set in Sri Lanka
Novels set in the 1980s
Second-person narrative novels
Sri Lankan Civil War books
Sri Lankan English-language novels